Euploea asyllus  is a species of nymphalid butterfly in the Danainae subfamily. It is endemic to the Solomon Islands. Subspecies E. a. gerion Godman & Salvin, 1888 is found on Malaita.

References 

Euploea
Butterflies described in 1888
Taxa named by Frederick DuCane Godman
Taxa named by Osbert Salvin